Pythio is a village and a community of the Elassona municipality. Before the 2011 local government reform it was a part of the municipality of Olympos, of which it was a municipal district. The 2011 census recorded 433 inhabitants in the village. The community of Pythio covers an area of 38.959 km2.

Population
According to the 2011 census, the population of the settlement of Pythio was 433 people, a decrease of almost 33% compared with the population of the previous census of 2001.

See also
 List of settlements in the Larissa regional unit

References

Populated places in Larissa (regional unit)